Low vision is both a subspeciality and a condition. Optometrists, Opticians and Ophthalmologists after their training may undergo further training in Low vision assessment and management. There are various classifications for low vision, this varies from country to country and even from state to state. It must however be noted that the work of a low vision specialist is very important as they aid individuals with reduced vision even in the presence of conventional lenses to be able to make use of their residual vision. People benefitting from low vision assessment must be motivated to make use of the residual vision and must again be willing to use the various aids that would be prescribed.

Classification
The World Health Organization (WHO) classifies people with low vision as follows:
1. 6/18 (20/60) [0.5] to 6/60 (20/200) [1.0]
2. 6/60 (20/200) [1.0] to 3/60 (20/400) [1.3]
3. 3/60 (20/400) [1.3] to 1/60 (20/1200) [1.8]
readings from left to right are in metres, feet and LogMAR values

Examinations

Low vision visual acuity examinations are done using the LogMAR chart. The advantage that this presents with is that it allows for more accurate measures of the individual's vision to be recorded. Other tests done and their significance are as follows:
Amsler's grid test - to locate scotomas on the visual field of the individual
Colour sensitivity test - to assess the function of the Optic nerve
Contrast sensitivity test - to assess the function of rods photoreceptors
Visual field test - to know the extent of the individual's field that is sensitive
Near visual acuity - to assess the reading ability at near

References

External links

Low Vision information from the National Eye Institute
Low Vision at the American Optometric Association
https://web.archive.org/web/20160304000609/http://www.aoa.org/documents/CPG-14.pdf
Special Issue on Low Vision, Journal of Visual Impairment & Blindness, October 2004

Visual disturbances and blindness

bg:Зрителни увреждания
ca:Baixa visió
cs:Oftalmopedie
de:Sehbehinderung
et:Nägemispuue
es:Baja visión
fr:Malvoyant
ko:시각 장애
it:Ipovisione
he:לקות ראייה
nl:Visuele handicap
ja:ロービジョン
no:Synstap
pl:Wada wzroku
pt:Baixa visão
sk:Tyflopédia
fi:Näkövamma
zh:視力障礙